Diego Hidalgo and Cristian Rodríguez were the defending champions but lost in the final to Pedro Boscardin Dias and João Lucas Reis da Silva.

Boscardin Dias and Reis da Silva won the title after defeating Hidalgo and Rodríguez 6–4, 3–6, [10–7] in the final.

Seeds

Draw

References

External links
 Main draw

Challenger de Santiago - Doubles
2023 Doubles